Associazione Sportiva Dilettante Pisoniano is an Italian association football club located in Pisoniano, Lazio. It played in the Eccellenza Lazio. Its colors are green and blue.

External links
 Official homepage

Football clubs in Italy
Football clubs in Lazio